The rowing competitions at the 2024 Summer Olympics in Paris are scheduled to run from 27 July to 3 August at the National Olympic Nautical Stadium of Île-de-France in Vaires-sur-Marne. The number of rowers competing across fourteen gender-based categories at these Games has been reduced from 526 to 502, with an equal distribution between men and women. Despite the slight changes in athlete figures, the rowing program for Paris 2024 remains constant from the previous edition as the competition will feature an equal number of categories for men and women, with seven each.

Competition format 
The rowing program featured a total of fourteen events, seven each for both men and women in identical boat classes. This gender equality was suggested by the World Rowing Federation at its February 2017 congress, with the recommendation adopted by the International Olympic Committee in June 2017. As a result, this balance deleted the men's lightweight four and added the women's coxless four classes. The women's coxless four previously ran at the 1992 Barcelona Olympics; the only time this boat class was an Olympic event. The changes to the Olympic rowing schedule were the first since the 1996 Atlanta Olympics.

Events for the 2024 Paris Olympics consisted two rowing disciplines: sweep rowing, where competitors each use a single oar, and sculling, where they use two placed on opposite sides of the boat. They also included a single lightweight (weight restricted) event for each gender: the lightweight double sculls. Sculling events included men's and women's singles, doubles, lightweight doubles, and quads. Sweep events included men's and women's coxless pairs, coxless fours, and eights.

Qualification

502 rowing quota places are available for Paris 2024, about twenty-four less overall than those in Tokyo 2020. Qualified NOCs are entitled to enter a single boat for each of the fourteen categories.

The qualification period commences at the 2023 World Rowing Championships, scheduled for 3 to 10 September in Belgrade, Serbia, where about two-thirds of the total quota will be awarded to the highest-ranked crews across fourteen categories. Explicitly, these quota places will be distributed to the NOCs, not to specific rowers, finishing among the top nine in the single sculls (both men and women), top seven in the lightweight double sculls, fours, and quadruple sculls, top five in the eights, and top eleven each in the pairs and double sculls. The remainder of the total quota will be attributed to the eligible rowers at each of the four continental qualification regattas in Asia and Oceania, the Americas, Africa, and Europe, and at the final Olympic qualification regatta in Lucerne, Switzerland.

As the host country, France reserves one quota place in the men's and women's single sculls. Four quota places (two per gender) are entitled to the NOCs competing in the same category under the Tripartite Commission.

Competition schedule

Participation

Events by number of boats entered
Each event shares the same number of boats entered for men and women.

Medal summary

Medal table

Men’s events

Women's events

See also
Rowing at the 2022 Asian Games
Rowing at the 2023 Pan American Games

References

 
2024
2024 Summer Olympics events
Rowing competitions in France
2024 in rowing